Roy Horniman (1874–1930) was a British writer, best known for his novel Israel Rank: The Autobiography of a Criminal, which inspired several adaptations.

Horniman was born in Southsea. His father, William Horniman, was Paymaster-in-Chief of the British Royal Navy, and his mother was Greek.

He was the owner of The Ladies' Review for some years and was a member of the British Committee of The Indian National Congress. As well as acting he became tenant and manager of the Criterion Theatre and wrote many plays as well as adaptations of his own and others’ novels. In his later years he wrote and adapted for the screen. Amongst his notable works were Israel Rank: The Autobiography of a Criminal (1907), which was republished by Faber Finds in 2008 and again by Cavalier Classics in 2014, and by Dean Street Press in 2020. The 1949 film Kind Hearts and Coronets was based on Israel Rank: The Autobiography of a Criminal and the novel also inspired the 2013 Broadway musical A Gentleman's Guide to Love and Murder.  Horniman also wrote The Sin of Atlantis in 1900 and Lord Cammarleigh’s Secret: A Fairy Story of To-Day in 1907.

Roy Horniman served in the Artists Rifles during the First World War.

References

External links
 
 
 

1874 births
1930 deaths
British theatre managers and producers
20th-century British novelists
British male screenwriters
Artists' Rifles soldiers
British Army personnel of World War I
British male novelists
English people of Greek descent
20th-century British male writers
20th-century British screenwriters